Ryu Mi-yong (14 February 1921 – 23 November 2016) was the chairwoman of the North Korean Chondoist Chongu Party. She was a standing committee member of the 10th Supreme People's Assembly. She was known as a defector from South Korea to the North.

Biography
Ryu was the only daughter born in Harbin to independence activist Ryu dong ryol.She married Choe Deok-sin in 1937 in China. She and her husband Choe Deok-sin defected to the North in 1986.  In 2000, she led a delegation of defectors to the South on an officially sanctioned reunion with family they left behind. Ryu died of lung cancer in November 2016. Ryu's second son, Choe In-guk, reportedly defected to North Korea in July 2019.

Ryu had received the Order of Kim Il-sung, Order of Kim Jong-il and National Reunification Prize.

On her funeral committee were:
 Yang Hyong-sop
 Kim Yong-chol
 Kim Yong-dae
 Jon Yong-nam
 Ju Yong-gil
 Ri Myong-gil
 Kim Jong-sung
 Ri Song-won
 Pak Myong-chol
 Ri Kil-song
 Yun Jong-ho

Awards and honors 
A frame displaying Ryu's decorations was placed at the foot of her bier during her funeral.

Notes

References

1921 births
2016 deaths
People from Harbin
Chondoist Chongu Party politicians
Leaders of political parties in North Korea
South Korean defectors
South Korean emigrants to North Korea
20th-century North Korean women politicians
20th-century North Korean politicians
21st-century North Korean women politicians
21st-century North Korean politicians
Recipients of the National Reunification Prize
Recipients of the Order of Kim Il-sung
Recipients of the Order of Kim Jong-il
Deaths from lung cancer